Paul Detlefsen (October 3, 1899 - August 1, 1986) was a commercial artist of the mid to late 20th century, associated with the "Hollywood scene".  He is known for his realistic depictions of serene, nostalgic scenes; his works were reproduced in a popular line of calendars and other prints.

Biography
Paul Detlefsen was born in Copenhagen, Denmark.  He was the son of a medical doctor.  He studied at the School of the Art Institute of Chicago before moving to Hollywood to build his reputation as a cartoonist.  After not succeeding as an animator, he produced backdrops for films. In the 1920s, he worked under Ferdinand Earle--father of animator Eyvind Earle--on a "motion painting" adaptation of Faust in which Mary Pickford was slated to star. He was nominated at the 17th Academy Awards, along with coworkers John Crouse and Nathan Levinson, for their work on the 1944 film The Adventures of Mark Twain.  The only other films Detlefsen is credited for are The Horn Blows at Midnight (1945), Escape in the Desert (1945), and Shadow of a Woman (1946), but he spent 20 years at Warner Brothers Studios, eventually rising to be in charge of the art department that created matte backdrops.

Detlefsen then shifted to a career in calendar artwork. His art was lithographed into calendars, reproductions, playing cards, jigsaw puzzles, mats for tables, and even four-foot wide wall murals.  His first calendar, published in 1951, was "The Good Old Days", which focused on landscape art.  In 1969, UPI estimated that 80% of all Americans had seen his work.

In 1964, Paul and his wife, Shelly, moved to Encinitas, California where Paul continued painting into the last few months of his life.

References

1899 births
1986 deaths
20th-century American painters
American male painters
Danish painters
Matte painters
School of the Art Institute of Chicago alumni
Artists from Copenhagen
Danish emigrants to the United States
20th-century American male artists